Big Tent Revival is a Christian rock band formed in Memphis, Tennessee, in 1991 by Steve Wiggins. They were signed to Ardent Records who had a distribution deal with Forefront Records. They disbanded in 2000 after having released five albums, had two releases after disbanding, and reformed in 2012 after a successful crowdfunding campaign for a new album. They are best known for their songs "Two Sets of Jones", "Choose Life", and "What Would Jesus Do?" and were featured at the Harvest Crusades.

Background 

Steve Wiggins released a self-titled album on Sparrow Records in 1991. He  subsequently formed Big Tent Revival.

Wiggins released two additional solo albums after the group disbanded: Faith That Is Real (2002, Ardent/Chordant) and Aliyah (2010). He was also featured on six tracks of the 2007 Harvest Worship Band Release 'Praise Worthy' and four tracks of the 2010 Harvest Worship Band release, 'Enter In'. He also founded and runs the Living Room Study, a Bible study group, using a chapter-a-day approach to learning the bible that also incorporates weekly music and teaching events in public coffeehouses. Wiggins also writes songs for pastor Greg Laurie, along with Hanz Ives and Bill Batstone.

Guitarist Randy Williams now works as a marketing consultant after touring for six years as a guitarist for Jeremy Camp.

Spence Smith works for Compassion International in Artist Relations and maintains the blog Spence Smith – Connecting People To Life.

The band released The Way Back Home on October 30, 2012, a project that was financed through KickStarter.

Band members 

 Steve Wiggins (1991-2000, 2012–present) – vocals and guitar (has, since the band's breakup, produced at least one solo album)
 Spence Smith (1991-2000, 2012–present) – drums
 Randy Williams (1996-2000, 2012–present) – lead guitar
 David Alan (1997-2000, 2012–present) – keyboards, B-3
 Steve Dale (1999-2000, 2012–present) – bass guitar

Former
 David White (1993–94) – bass guitar
 Mike Foster (1994–95) – bass guitar
 Brent Milligan (1995–96) – bass guitar
 Rick Heil (1996–98) – bass guitar

Discography 

With the exception of their 1993 release, each of BTR's albums has been nominated for a Grammy Award. The band has also been nominated for several Dove Awards.
 Steve Wiggins and Big Tent Revival (1993)
 Big Tent Revival (1995)
 Open All Nite (1996)
 Amplifier (1998)
 Choose Life (1999)
 Big Tent Revival Live (2001)
 Greatest Hits (2002)
 The Way Back Home (2012)

References

External links

Secondary Website 2004–2011
 Spence Smith
Randy Williams
David Alan 

American Christian rock groups
Musical groups established in 1991
1991 establishments in the United States